The 1937 Palestine Cup (HaGavia HaEretz-Israeli) was the eighth season of Israeli Football Association's nationwide football cup competition. The defending holders were Maccabi Avshalom Petah Tikva.

Reinstated after a year's hiatus, due to the outbreak of the 1936-1939 Arab revolt, the competition saw Hapoel HaDarom Tel Aviv upsetting Maccabi Tel Aviv and reaching the final, aided by suspensions that were handed to Maccabi players, forcing the club to field a youth team for the Semi-final match against Hapoel HaDarom

In the final, Hapoel Tel Aviv defeated Hapoel HaDarom 3–0 to win its third cup.

Results

First round

Byes: Hapoel HaDarom Tel Aviv, Hapoel Rishon LeZion

Quarter-finals

Replay

Semi-finals

Final

Notes

References
100 Years of Football 1906–2006, Elisha Shohat (Israel), 2006

External links
 Israel Football Association website 

Israel State Cup
Cup
Israel State Cup seasons